Salzatal is a municipality in the Saalekreis district, Saxony-Anhalt, Germany. It was formed on 1 January 2010 by the merger of the former municipalities Beesenstedt, Bennstedt, Fienstedt, Höhnstedt, Kloschwitz, Lieskau, Salzmünde, Schochwitz and Zappendorf.

References

 
Saalekreis